Gu Hui, may refer to:

 Gu Hui (politician), an official serving under the warlord Sun Quan in the late Eastern Han dynasty of China.

 Gu Hui (general), a general (shangjiang) of the People's Liberation Army (PLA) who served as Commander of the Nanjing Military Region.